The 2022 season was the Las Vegas Raiders' 53rd season in the National Football League, their 63rd overall, their third in Las Vegas and their first under the head coach/general manager tandem of Josh McDaniels and Dave Ziegler.

The Raiders failed to make to the playoffs in back-to-back seasons for the first time since 2001 and 2002 when the franchise was based in Oakland. However, the Raiders started the season with a 2–7 record on their way to a disappointing 6–11 record, missing the playoffs. The Raiders failed to improve on their 10–7 record from the previous season and had their first losing season since 2019. Throughout the season, the Raiders had suffered several blown leads, which included giving up leads by at least 17 points in three games. Nine of their 11 losses were all within one-possession. They became the first team in NFL history to lose five or more times in a season while leading by double-digits in the second half.

Offseason

Front office changes 
On January 17, the team announced that general manager Mike Mayock had been fired after three years with the team. On January 30, the Raiders named longtime New England Patriots' executive Dave Ziegler as their new general manager. On May 6, Raiders' owner Mark Davis announced that team president Dan Ventrelle was no longer with the organization. Following this, Ventrelle alleged that Raiders' owner Mark Davis created a hostile work environment, and once the former president acknowledged this, he was fired. Around May 21, Marcel Reece, already senior advisor and then chief people officer, became team senior vice president, chief of staff. On July 7, the team announced Sandra Douglass Morgan as new president. Morgan is the first black woman in NFL history to assume this role.

Coaching changes 
Interim coach Rich Bisaccia, who replaced Jon Gruden after his resignation after five games in the 2021 season, was not assured of returning as head coach despite the Raiders making the playoffs the previous season. Bisaccia did interview for the permanent coaching position. However, the Raiders conducted other interviews as well.

On January 31, the team officially named New England Patriots' offensive coordinator Josh McDaniels the team's new head coach. McDaniels named Mick Lombardi offensive coordinator and Patrick Graham defensive coordinator.

Notable free agent acquisitions

Trades

Notable players released

Draft 

Draft trades

Staff

Final roster

Preseason 
On February 28, the NFL announced that the Raiders would play the Jacksonville Jaguars in the Pro Football Hall of Fame Game on Thursday, August 4, at Tom Benson Hall of Fame Stadium in Canton, Ohio, at 5:00 p.m. PDT. The Raiders had two former players enter the Hall of Fame, wide receiver Cliff Branch, who died in 2019, as well as defensive tackle Richard Seymour. The two teams will meet again during the regular season in Jacksonville. On May 12, the rest of the Raiders' preseason opponents were announced. The complete preseason schedule was announced on May 18.

The Raiders won all of their preseason games closing with a 4–0 record; it was the first time in team history the Raiders went undefeated in the preseason.

Regular season

Schedule 

Note: Intra-division opponents are in bold text.

Game summaries

Week 1: at Los Angeles Chargers 
The Raiders began the season on the road facing their division rival, the Los Angeles Chargers, at SoFi Stadium.

The Chargers got the ball first and moved quickly into Raider territory before the Vegas defense stiffened and forced the Chargers to settle for a 43-yard field goal and an early 3–0 lead. The Raiders answered by also moving into their opponent's territory and, helped by a Davante Adams catch and run, reached the Charger four yard line. However, a loss on a Josh Jacobs run and two incomplete passes led to Daniel Carlson's 23-yard field goal to tie the game. Following punts by both teams, the game moved to the second quarter and Justin Herbert hit Zander Horvath on a one-yard touchdown pass to give LA the 10–3 lead. The Raiders were again forced to punt and the Chargers moved to the Raider 28. However, they chose to go for it on fourth down and were stuffed by the Raider defense giving Vegas the ball with 1:38 left in the half. Following a sack on the first play of the ensuing possession, Derek Carr was intercepted at midfield and the Chargers returned the ball to the Vegas 31 with 45 seconds left in the half. Two plays later, Herbert threw his second toudown pass of the game, a 25-yard score to DeAndre Carter to extend the LA lead to 17–3 with 35 seconds left in the half. The Raiders chose to kneel on the final play of the half and entered halftime trailing by two touchdowns.

In the second half, the Raiders scored quickly as Carr his Adams for a 41-yard play that moved the ball into LA territory. Three plays later, Carr hit Brandon Bolden for an 18-yard touchdown to narrow the score to 17–10. However, the Chargers quickly responded as Herbert hit Gerald Everett for an 18-yard touchdown of his own, returning the Charger lead to 14. The Raiders moved into LA territory on the next possession, but were forced to settle for a 55-yard field goal to move within 10. Following a punt by the Chargers early in the fourth quarter, Carr hit Darren Waller for a 23-yard gain, but was intercepted for the second time a play later on a pass intended for Adams at the Charger two yard line. Following a punt by the Chargers, Carr was intercepted for the third time in the game, giving the Chargers the ball at midfield. After forcing the Chargers to attempt a 49-yard field goal that was no good, Carr moved the Raiders into LA territory. with less than five minutes remaining in the game, Carr hit Adams for a three-yard touchdown to narrow the score to 24–19. Following an LA punt, the Raiders took over with 3:30 left in the game. However, Carr was sacked by former Raider Khalil Mack and fumbled the ball giving the Chargers the ball with 1:52 left in the game. The Chargers were able to run out the clock to win the game 24–19.

The loss moved the Raiders to 0–1 on the season. Carr threw for 295 yards in the loss, but had four turnovers (three interceptions and a fumble) in the loss. Adams had 10 receptions for 141 yards and a touchdown in his first game for Vegas.

Week 2: vs. Arizona Cardinals 
The Raiders, playing in their home opener at Allegiant Stadium, blew a 20–0 lead and lost, in overtime, to a struggling Cardinals team still reeling from a Week 1 home defeat. Derek Carr threw two touchdown passes, one to Davante Adams and the other to Darren Waller, while Daniel Carlson added two field goals to provide the 20-point margin. However, in the second half, Arizona began to come back. It started when Greg Dortsch caught a five-yard touchdown pass from Kyler Murray to cut the lead to 20–7. The Raiders however, responded with aCarlson field goal to give Vegas a 23–7 lead to start the fourth quarter. However, the Cardinals quickly answered on Darrel Williams one-yard touchdown run. Murray scrambled in to add the two-point conversion to narrow the lead to 23–15. Following a punt by the Raiders, he Cardinals moved downfield on an 18-play drive capped off with Murray running in for a three-yard touchdown to pull with two as the quarter ended. Murray's throw to A. J. Green on the two-point conversion tied the game at 23. In overtime, the Cardinals received the ball, but turned it over on fourth down, giving the ball back to the Raiders. However, Raiders' receiver Hunter Renfrow fumbled the ball on the ensuing Raiders drive and Cardinals' defender Byron Murphy recovered and returned the fumble 59 yards for the game-winning touchdown. The Raiders lost 29–23 and fell to 0–2 on the season.

Week 3: at Tennessee Titans 
With an 0–2 record to the start the season, the Raiders traveled to Nashville to face the Titans. Following a Ryan Tannehill touchdown pass to give the Titans a 7–0 lead, Daniel Carlson connected on a 21-yard field goal to narrow the lead to four. Derrick Henry scored on the next Titans' possession to pus the lead to 14–3 early in the second quarter. Derek Carr answered the score, hitting Davante Adams on a 5-yard touchdown pass to pull with four. Tannehill returned the Titans' lead to 11 with a one-yard touchdown run with under five minutes left in the half. Neither team could manage much on the next few possessions before the Titans took over at midfield with 21 second left in the half. A Randy Bullock field goal as time expired gave Tennessee the 24–10 halftime lead. A Carlson field goal accounted for all the scoring in the third quarter despite a Tannehill interception. The Titans turned the ball over on downs early in the fourth quarter, but Carr was intercepted on the ensuing possession. Following a punt by the Titans, Carlson hit another field goal to narrow the lead to eight with 3:29 left in the game. The Raider defense forced a punt on the next possession and the Raiders took over with 2:57 left and down by eight. Carr hit Mack Hollis on a nine-yard touchdown pass with 1:14 left in the game. Needing a two-point conversion to tie the game, Carr's pass to Darren Waller was incomplete. The ensuing onside kick failed and the Titans ran out the clock as the Raiders lost 24–22. The loss dropped Vegas to 0–3 on the season.

Week 4: vs. Denver Broncos 
{{Americanfootballbox
|titlestyle=;text-align:center;
|state=autocollapse
|title=Week 4: Denver Broncos at Las Vegas Raiders – Game summary
|date=October 2
|time=1:25 p.m. PDT
|road=Broncos
|R1=7|R2=9|R3=0|R4=7
|home=Raiders
|H1=3|H2=16|H3=3|H4=10
|stadium=Allegiant Stadium, Paradise, Nevada
|attendance=62,332
|weather=None (indoor stadium)
|referee=Land Clark
|TV=CBS
|TVAnnouncers=Kevin Harlan, Trent Green and Melanie Collins
|reference=Recap, Game Book
|scoring=
First quarter
LV – Daniel Carlson 26-yard field goal, 9:52. Raiders 3–0. Drive: 11 plays, 60 yards, 5:08.
DEN – Courtland Sutton 5-yard pass from Russell Wilson (Brandon McManus kick), 2:45. Broncos 7–3. Drive: 4 plays, 34 yards, 2:09.
Second quarter
LV – Josh Jacobs 5-yard run (Daniel Carlson kick), 11:46. Raiders 10–7. Drive: 11 plays, 75 yards, 5:59.
DEN – Brandon McManus 28-yard field goal, 8:03. Tied 10–10. Drive: 7 plays, 39 yards, 3:42.
LV – Amik Robertson 68-yard fumble return (kick failed), 3:15. Raiders 16–10.DEN – Jerry Jeudy 20-yard pass from Russell Wilson (kick failed), 1:24. Tied 16–16. Drive: 5 plays, 75 yards, 1:51.
LV – Daniel Carlson 39-yard field goal, 0:00. Raiders 19–16. Drive: 10 plays, 54 yards, 1:24.Third quarterLV – Daniel Carlson 22-yard field goal, 2:27. Raiders 22–16. Drive: 10 plays, 77 yards, 4:42.Fourth quarterLV – Daniel Carlson 30-yard field goal, 9:50. Raiders 25–16. Drive: 6 plays, 38 yards, 3:15.
DEN – Russell Wilson 3-yard run (Brandon McManus kick), 7:16. Raiders 25–23. Drive: 6 plays, 75 yards, 2:34.
LV – Josh Jacobs 7-yard run (Daniel Carlson kick), 2:02. Raiders 32–23. Drive: 10 plays, 75 yards, 5:14.
|stats=Top passers DEN – Russell Wilson – 17/25, 237 yards, 2 TD
 LV – Derek Carr – 21/34, 188 yardsTop rushers DEN – Russell Wilson – 4 rushes, 29 yards, TD
 LV – Josh Jacobs – 28 rushes, 144 yards, 2 TDTop receivers' DEN – K. J. Hamler – 1 reception, 55 yards
 LV – Davante Adams – 9 receptions, 101 yards
}}Still looking for their first win on the season, the Raiders returned home to face the Broncos. An early Daniel Carlson field goal gave the Raiders a 3–0 lead. Following punts by both teams, Russell Wilson threw a five-yard touchdown pass to give the Broncos a 7–3 lead. Josh Jacobs answered with a 10-yard touchdown run to return the Vegas lead to three early in the second quarter. After the Broncos tied it on a field goal, Amik Robertson returned a Melvin Gordon fumble 68 yards for a 16–10 lead after Carlson missed the extra point. Wilson answered with a 20-yard touchdown pass and a failed kick on the extra point left the game tied at 16. A Carlson 39-yard field goal as the half ended gave the Raiders a 19–16 lead at halftime. Carlson added two more field goals as the game moved to the fourth quarter with the Raiders ahead 25–16. Wilson scored on a three-yard run with seven minutes left in the game to narrow the lead to 25–23. Jacobs second touchdown run of the game with just over two minutes remaining sealed the win for the Raiders. The 32–23 win marked the Raiders first win of the season. Jacobs rushed for 144 yards on 28 attempts and two touchdowns in the win.

 Week 5: at Kansas City Chiefs 
The Raiders next traveled to Kansas City to face the Chiefs on Monday Night Football. The Raiders blew a 17–0 lead and lost to the Chiefs, 30–29. The Raiders took the lead early in the first quarter when Derek Carr hit Davante Adams on a 58-yard touchdown pass. Following a missed field goal by the Chiefs, Josh Jacobs scored on a one-yard run to give the Raiders a 14–0 lead early in the second quarter. A Daniel Carlson field goal pushed the lead to 17 before Patrick Mahomes led the Chiefs on a six play, 43-yard drive to narrow the lead to 17–7. Carlson's second field goal of the game with 17 seconds left in the half pushed the lead to 20–7. However, Mahomes quickly put the Chiefs in field goal position and Matthew Wright's 59-yard field goal as the half ended left the Raiders ahead 20–10 at the half. The Chiefs narrowed the lead to three as Mahomes hit Travis Kelce for his second touchdown in the game on the first drive of the second half. Following a punt, Mahomes hit Kelce again to give KC the 24–20 lead. Carlson's field goal early in the fourth quarter left the Raiders trailing by one point. Kelce's fourth touchdown catch of the game and a missed two-point conversion left Vegas trailing 30–23 with seven minutes left. Carr answered the score, hitting Adams again on a 48-yard touchdown pass to bring the Raiders within a point with 4:27 remaining. Electing to try for two to take the lead, Jacobs was stuffed as the conversion failed. Still trailing by one, the Raiders forced the Chiefs to punt with 2:29 left. Vegas was able to move to midfield, but time ran out as the Raiders lost 30–29. Jacobs ran for 154 yards in the loss.

 Week 7: vs. Houston Texans 
After a bye week, the Raiders looked to turn around their season as they faced the Texans in Las Vegas. In a must-win game for both teams, Las Vegas would come out on top. The Raiders scored the only points of the first quarter by virtue of a 50-yard field goal by Daniel Carlson, only to let the Texans score 10 unanswered points to swipe the lead from them in the second quarter, via a 13-yard touchdown pass from Davis Mills to Chris Moore, and a 55-yard field goal from Ka'imi Fairbairn. A 26-yard touchdown pass from Derek Carr to Mack Hollins tied the game at 10 at the half. The lead seesawed for the whole third quarter. To open the second half, Ka'imi Fairbairn reclaimed the Texans' lead on a 35-yard field goal, making the score 13-10 in favor of them. The Raiders swiped the lead back with a 4-yard touchdown run from Josh Jacobs to put Vegas up 17-13. Davis Mills connected with Phillip Dorsett for a 25-yard touchdown pass, putting the Texans up 20-17, and once again swiping the lead from the Raiders. However, in the fourth quarter, it was all Raiders, as they scored the final 21 points, largely courtesy of Josh Jacobs, who found the end zone twice more. He ran in a second touchdown from 7 yards out to put the Raiders up, 24-20, and with 7:06 left on the clock, Jacobs would run in his third and last touchdown of the day, from 15 yards out, to give the Raiders a 31-20 lead. The epilogue of the game came when Duron Harmon recorded a pick six off of Mills, reaching the final score of 38–20, and giving the Raiders just what they needed.

With the win, the Raiders improved to 2–4. Overall, Josh Jacobs ran for 143 yards on 20 attempts and 3 touchdowns, averaging 7.2 yards per carry in the win.

 Week 8: at New Orleans Saints 
Traveling to face the Saints in New Orleans, the Raiders' offense struggled mightily, punting on their first three possessions. Meanwhile, the Saints, led by backup quarterback Andy Dalton, took a 7–0 lead on an Alvin Kamara three-yard touchdown run late in the first quarter. The Raiders attempted a fake punt on their first possession of the second quarter which failed and gave the Saints the ball in Raiders' territory. A 37-yard field goal by Wil Lutz made it 10–0. Following an interception of a Derek Carr pass on the ensuing possession, the Saints moved the lead to 17 on a touchdown pass from Dalton to Kamara. The Raider offense punted on its only other possession of the first half and a missed field goal by Lutz as the half ended left the Raiders behind 17–0 at halftime. The second half was no different than the first for the Raiders as they were forced to punt before Dalton again hit Kamara for a touchdown pass to extend the lead to 24. Las Vegas was forced to punt on their next two possessions and although the Saints failed to score again, the Raiders turned to backups for their final possession. They were shut out 24–0 in the game and fell to 2–5 on the season.

 Week 9: at Jacksonville Jaguars 

The Raiders next traveled to Jacksonville to face the Jaguars. After punting on their first possession, the Raiders allowed the Jaguars to move into Raider territory, but a fumble ended the drive. Derek Carr hit Davante Adams on a 25-yard touchdown pass to give the Raiders a 7–0 lead. A Daniel Carlson field goal pushed the lead to 10 before Carr hit Adams again, this time from 38 yards, to take a 17–0 lead. The Jaguars answered with a touchdown run by Travis Etienne to narrow the lead to 10. Another Carlson field goal was answered by a Jaguars' field goal as the half ended with a 20–10 Raider lead. The Jaguars narrowed the lead to three on a Trevor Lawrence touchdown pass on the first possession of the second half. The Raider offense struggled again for the remainder of the half, allowing another Etienne touchdown run to give the Jaguars a 24–20 lead. A Jaguar field goal moved the lead to seven while the Raider offense could not muster any more points. As a result, the Raiders fell 27–20. It was Las Vegas' third blown lead of 17 points or more on the season. With the loss, Vegas fell to 2–6 on the season.

 Week 10: vs. Indianapolis Colts 
The Raiders returned home to face the Colts and new head coach Jeff Saturday. The Raider offense continued to struggle, failing to score on its first four possessions. A Matt Ryan one-yard run gave the Colts 7–0 lead late in the first quarter. A Colts' field goal pushed the lead to 10 early in the second quarter. With less than two minutes left in the half, Derek Car hit Foster Moreau for a four-yard touchdown pass to narrow the lead to three. However, the Vegas defense allowed the Colts to push the ball to the Raider 30 with three seconds left in the half. A field goal pushed the Colts' lead to 13–7 at the half. After a missed field goal by Indianapolis to start the second half, Josh Jacobs scored on a one-yard run to give the Raiders their first lead, 14–13. However, on the first play of the ensuing possession, Jonathan Taylor scored on a 66-yard run to restore the Colts' lead. A failed two-point conversion left the score at 19–14. Carr next hit Davante Adams on 48-yard touchdown pass to take a 20–19 lead after the failed two-point conversion. Following punts by both teams, Matt Ryan hit Parris Campbell on a 35-yard touchdown pass. The two-point conversion failed again, leaving the lead 25–20. Vegas was able to move deep into Indy territory, but the drive stalled at the Colts' 16 and Derek Carr's fourth down pass fell incomplete with 47 second left as the Raiders lost again, 25–20. The loss dropped the Raiders to 2–7 on the season. The Raiders were also the only team to lose to the Colts under Jeff Saturday.

 Week 11: at Denver Broncos 
The Raiders returned to the road to face division foe, Denver, one of only two teams the Raiders had beat on the season. The Broncos scored first on the second possession of the game on a one-yard run by former Raider Latavius Murray. Daniel Carlson missed his first field goal of the season on Vegas' next possession and a Brandon McManus field goal pushed the Denver lead to 10. The Raiders finally got on the board when Derek Carr hit Davante Adams for a 31-yard touchdown pass to bring the score to 10–7 with less than six minutes left in the half. The Broncos moved into Raider territory as the half drew to a close, but the Raiders were able to force Denver to settle for a 25-yard field goal that was blocked by Maxx Crosby. A Carlson field goal started the scoring in the second half and moved the score to 10–10. Neither offense could muster any more points in the third quarter. McManus kicked another field goal, this time from 52 yards out to move the score to 13–10. Carlson added a 57-yard field goal with 7:11 remaining in the fourth quarter to tie the game. The Broncos retook the lead four minutes later with 48-yard field goal to move the lead to 16–13. After exchanging punts, the Raiders moved to the Denver seven, but were forced to settle for a field goal with 16 seconds left to tie the game. As the game moved to overtime, the Raiders won the toss and took the ball. On the third play of overtime, Carr threw to a wide open Davante Adams for 35-yard touchdown to end the game at 22–16. The win moved the Raiders to 3–7 on the season.

 Week 12: at Seattle Seahawks 

After a comeback win over Russell Wilson's current team, the Broncos, the Las Vegas Raiders travelled to Seattle to play his former team, the Seattle Seahawks. Las Vegas began the game very poorly, with Derek Carr already getting intercepted on only the first play. This set up a 12-yard touchdown run by Kenneth Walker, giving the Seahawks a 7-0 lead in the first 28 seconds. Just over 5 minutes later, Carr hit Ameer Abdullah with an 18-yard touchdown pass to tie the game at 7. However, on his 3rd drive, he would throw another interception, which the Seahawks took a 10-7 lead off of by virtue of a 24-yard field goal from Jason Myers as the first quarter ended. From that point on, Derek Carr and the Raiders would shape up.

In the second quarter, Jason Meyers kicked a 34-yard field goal to bring the Seahawks' lead up to 13-7. Carr hit Mack Hollins with a 36-yard touchdown pass to swipe the Seahawks' lead and put the Raiders up, 14-13. After an interception by Geno Smith, Josh Jacobs ran for a 30-yard touchdown to bring the Raiders' lead up to 21-13. The Seahawks came within one point when Smith hit Tyler Lockett with a 35-yard touchdown pass. A 36-yard field goal from Daniel Carlson put the Raiders up, 24-20, at the half. 

In the third quarter, Kenneth Walker would run in a second touchdown from 14 yards out to swipe the lead from the Raiders and put the Seahawks up, 27-24, and then, by virtue of Daniel Carlson kicking a 25-yard field goal, the Raiders tied the game at 27. 

In the fourth quarter, Geno Smith would keep on shining, hitting Travis Homer with an 18-yard touchdown pass, putting the Seahawks up 34-27 with 5:37 left in regulation. However, the Raiders once again tied the game, this time, at 34, when Derek Carr hit Foster Moreau with a 5-yard touchdown pass. With neither team doing anything for the last 1:54 in regulation, it was time for overtime. 

40 seconds into overtime. Josh Jacobs broke off an 86-yard touchdown run to put the Raiders up, 40-34, drawing the game to a close and giving the Raiders their first win in Seattle since 1998, when they were based in Oakland, and the Seahawks were division mates with the Raiders.

With the upset win, the Raiders improved to 4-7. Josh Jacobs ran for 229 yards on 33 attempts for 2 touchdowns, including the touchdown that won the game for the Raiders, and averaged 6.9 yards per carry.

 Week 13: vs. Los Angeles Chargers 

After a chilling overtime win in Seattle, the Raiders returned home to face one of their AFC West division rivals, the Los Angeles Chargers. Las Vegas would overcome their second 10-point deficit in three games. Just like the previous game, Las Vegas began the game very poorly, with Bryce Callahan returning a Derek Carr interception for a score not even 10 minutes into the game, giving the Chargers a 7-0 lead.
 
In the second quarter, the game worsened for the Raiders when Cameron Dicker booted a 37-yard field goal to put them in a 10-0 hole. Josh Jacobs, though, would trim the Raiders' deficit to three points with a 20-yard touchdown run, and would eventually be accompanied by a 55-yard field goal from Daniel Carlson to tie the game at 10. However, the Chargers broke the tie with a 34-yard field goal by Cameron Dicker, putting them up, 13-10 at the half. 

Things significantly turned around for the Raiders in the second half, largely due to Derek Carr hitting Davante Adams with two consecutive touchdown passes in the third quarter, from 31 yards and 45 yards, respectively, and putting the Raiders up, 24-13. They kept Herbert in check, allowing a mere six points on the first eight drives. 

In the fourth quarter, a 25-yard field goal from Daniel Carlson brought the Raiders' to 27-13. Herbert hit Keenan Allen with a 35-yard touchdown pass on 4th down to make it a 27-20 game with 8:34 left, which would end up being the final score. Just as the Chargers appeared likely to come back to life, since they got the ball to Las Vegas' side of the field, they could not do anything, as the drive ended on a turnover on downs. 

With the upset win, the Raiders improved to 5–7. Davante Adams caught 8 passes for 177 yards and 2 touchdowns in the win.

 Week 14: at Los Angeles Rams 

 Week 15: vs. New England Patriots 

Despite almost squandering a 17–3 lead, the Raiders tied the game at 24 with a late controversial touchdown pass from Derek Carr to Keelan Cole, then won due to a bizarre blunder at the end of regulation by the Patriots. As New England quarterback Mac Jones handed the ball off to running back Rhamondre Stevenson, presumably to run out the clock and force overtime, Stevenson picked up 23 yards from the New England 44-yard-line to the Las Vegas 32-yard-line as the Raiders were in prevent defense. With Raiders safety Duron Harmon closing in, Stevenson pitched the ball to Patriots receiver Jakobi Meyers, who ran back to the 40-yard-line before throwing the ball back towards Mac Jones' vicinity, unaware that Raiders defender Chandler Jones was guarding him. The latter intercepted the ball and stiff-armed the former to the ground before running the ball back to the New England endzone for the Raiders' improbable game-winning touchdown, which was later nicknamed the "Vagary in Vegas" by NFL.com, "Col-lateral damage" by the Lowell Sun, and the "Lunatic Lateral" by Sports Illustrated''.

With the win, the Raiders defeated the Patriots for the first time since 2002, when the team was based in Oakland, and improved to 6–8.

Week 16: at Pittsburgh Steelers 

The Raiders blew a 10–3 lead and lost to Kenny Pickett and the Steelers, 13–10, on a 14-yard touchdown pass from Pickett to George Pickens. With the loss, the Raiders fell to 6–9, and suffered their first losing season since 2019 during the Oakland days. 

Derek Carr's time as a Raider came to an end after this game.

Week 17: vs. San Francisco 49ers

Week 18: vs. Kansas City Chiefs

Standings

Division

Conference

References

External links 
 

Las Vegas
Las Vegas Raiders seasons
Las Vegas Raiders